The Muppet Christmas Carol is a 1992 American Christmas musical comedy drama film directed by Brian Henson (in his feature directorial debut) from a screenplay by Jerry Juhl. Adapted from the 1843 novella A Christmas Carol by Charles Dickens, it stars Michael Caine as Ebenezer Scrooge, alongside Muppet performers Dave Goelz, Steve Whitmire, Jerry Nelson, and Frank Oz. Although artistic license is taken to suit the aesthetic of the Muppets, The Muppet Christmas Carol otherwise follows Dickens's original story closely. It is the fourth theatrical film in The Muppets franchise, and the first to be produced following the deaths of Muppets creator Jim Henson and performer Richard Hunt; the film is dedicated to both.

The film was released in the United States on December 11, 1992, by Buena Vista Pictures Distribution. It was a modest box office success and received mostly positive reviews. It is the first Muppets film to be produced by Walt Disney Pictures, whose parent company would later acquire the rights to the Muppets characters and assets in 2004.

Plot

On Christmas Eve, in 19th-century London, Charles Dickens (played by The Great Gonzo) and his friend Rizzo address the audience as narrators to tell the story of A Christmas Carol. Ebenezer Scrooge (Michael Caine), a cold-hearted, stingy, and lonely moneylender, does not share the merriment of Christmas ("Scrooge"). He rejects his nephew Fred's invitation to Christmas dinner, dismisses two gentlemen (played by Dr. Bunsen Honeydew and Beaker) collecting money for charity, and tosses a wreath at a carol-singing Bean Bunny ("Good King Wenceslas"). 

Scrooge's loyal employee Bob Cratchit (played by Kermit the Frog) and the other bookkeepers request to take Christmas Day off, as there will be no business for Scrooge on the day, to which he reluctantly agrees. Scrooge leaves for home while the bookkeepers celebrate Christmas ("One More Sleep Till Christmas").

In his house, Scrooge encounters the shackled ghosts of his late business partners, Jacob and Robert Marley (played by Statler and Waldorf), who warn him to repent his wicked ways or be condemned to suffer in the afterlife as they do. They inform him that three spirits will visit him, with the first to visit tonight when the bell tolls one ("Marley and Marley").

At one o'clock, Scrooge is visited by the childlike Ghost of Christmas Past, who takes him back in time to his childhood and early adult life, with Dickens and Rizzo hitching a ride too ("Christmas Past"). They visit his lonely school days ("Chairman of the Board") and then his time as an employee under Fozziwig (Mr. Fezziwig in the original story, played by Fozzie Bear), who owned a rubber chicken factory. Fozziwig and his mother throw a Christmas party, where Scrooge meets a young woman named Belle, with whom he falls in love ("Fozziwig Party"). However, the Ghost shows Scrooge how Belle left him after he chose money over her ("When Love is Gone"). A tearful Scrooge dismisses the Ghost as he returns to his bedroom.

At two o'clock, Scrooge meets the gigantic, merry Ghost of Christmas Present, who shows him the joys and wonder of Christmas Day ("It Feels Like Christmas"). Scrooge and the Ghost visit Fred's house, where Scrooge is made fun of for his stinginess and general ill will toward all. 

Scrooge and the spirit then visit Bob Cratchit's house, learning his family (Mrs. Cratchit is played by Miss Piggy) is content with their small dinner. Scrooge also takes pity on Bob's ill son Tiny Tim (played by Robin the Frog) ("Bless Us All"). The Ghost of Christmas Present abruptly ages, commenting that Tiny Tim will likely die if the future is not changed. Scrooge and the Ghost go to a cemetery, where the latter fades away.

The Ghost of Christmas Yet to Come, a tall, silent, cloaked figure, appears, scaring Dickens and Rizzo away for the rest of the scene. It takes Scrooge into the future, and shows Scrooge a group of businessmen discussing the death of an unnamed colleague, saying they would only attend the funeral if lunch was provided ("Christmas Future"). In a den, Scrooge sees a charwoman, a laundress, and the local undertaker trading several stolen possessions of the deceased to a fence named Old Joe. 

The Ghost then transports Scrooge to Bob's house, revealing Tiny Tim has died and the Crachits are mourning him. Scrooge is escorted back to the cemetery, where the Ghost points out the wretched man's grave, showing Scrooge was the man who died. Tearfully, Scrooge vows to change his ways and embraces the ghost's robes before finding himself back in his bedroom.

Discovering it is Christmas Day (Dickens and Rizzo return), Scrooge gleefully decides to surprise Bob's family with a turkey dinner and ventures out with Bean, Dickens, Rizzo, and the charity workers to spread happiness and joy around London, reconciling with Fred and Fozziwig ("Thankful Heart"). Scrooge goes to the Cratchit house, at first putting on a cold demeanor before revealing he intends to raise Bob's salary and pay off his mortgage. 

Scrooge, the Cratchits, Fred and the neighborhood celebrate Christmas, as Dickens narrates how Scrooge became a second father to Tiny Tim, who escaped death and got well again ("Finale/When Love is Found/It Feels Like Christmas").

Cast
 Michael Caine as Ebenezer Scrooge
 Edward Sanders, Theo Sanders, Kristopher Milnes, Russell Martin, and Ray Coulthard as Young Scrooge
 Steven Mackintosh as Fred, Ebenezer Scrooge's nephew.
 Meredith Braun as Belle, Scrooge's former love interest.
 Robin Weaver as Clara, Ebenezer Scrooge's niece-in-law and Fred's wife.
 Jessica Fox as the voice of the Ghost of Christmas Past
 David Shaw Parker as the voice of Old Joe

Muppet performers

Production
Following Jim Henson's death in May 1990, the talent agent Bill Haber approached Henson's son Brian with the idea of filming an adaptation. Haber told Henson that "Christmas Carol is the greatest story of all time, you should do that" and later informed Henson that he had sold the idea to ABC as a television film. The longtime Muppets writer Jerry Juhl was hired to write the script and decided to insert Charles Dickens as the stand-in narrator in order to remain faithful to the original prose of the written material. Henson stated that Gonzo was chosen because he was the least likely choice to play Charles Dickens, while Rizzo the Rat was added to inject some humor and serve as a Greek chorus. Established Muppet characters were initially written to portray the ghosts, with various accounts stating Robin the Frog or Scooter was to be the Ghost of Christmas Past, Miss Piggy to be the Ghost of Christmas Present, and Gonzo (before he was written to portray Dickens) or Animal as the Ghost of Christmas Yet to Come. However, the idea was scrapped in favor of new Muppet characters that would better underline the ominous nature. After the script was submitted for approval to ABC, the executives of Walt Disney Pictures offered to purchase the script for a feature film instead of a television release.

The English actors David Hemmings, Ron Moody, and David Warner and the American comedian George Carlin were considered to portray Ebenezer Scrooge. Henson later offered the role to Michael Caine, who replied: "I'm going to play this movie like I'm working with the Royal Shakespeare Company. I will never wink, I will never do anything Muppety. I am going to play Scrooge as if it is an utterly dramatic role and there are no puppets around me." He took inspiration for the role from "Wall Street cheats and embezzlers; I thought they represented a very good picture of meanness and greed."

Production took place at the Shepperton Studios, England. During filming, in order to allow for the Muppets and the human actors to be in the shot, floors had to be removed and re-inserted, with Michael Caine having to walk across narrow planks between the Muppets and their performers. Additionally, the buildings in the London street scenes were constructed by hand but diminished in size in order to achieve the appearance that the streets were relatively longer. When the musical sequence "It Feels Like Christmas" ends with a crane shot, the short buildings became visibly seen in the background; Brian Henson explained on the DVD audio commentary that they were aware of the problem during shooting, but eventually decided that the closing shot was worth it as they believed not many people would notice the error.

Release

Box office
Walt Disney Pictures appeared to have high expectations for the film, being their widest-released film of the holiday season and the second-widest release under the Disney banner that year. However, the film opened in sixth place, initially reported to have collected $5.9 million in box office estimates, which was later revised to $5 million. Ultimately, The Muppet Christmas Carol grossed a total of $27.3 million in North America. Despite being a modest box office success, The Muppet Christmas Carol did not have a large effect during its theatrical release, having to face competition from Home Alone 2: Lost in New York and Disney's own Aladdin.

Critical response 
On Rotten Tomatoes, the film has an approval rating of 75% based on 51 reviews, with an average rating of 6.70/10. The site's consensus states, "It may not be the finest version of Charles Dickens' tale to grace the screen, but The Muppet Christmas Carol is funny and heartwarming, and serves as a good introduction to the story for young viewers." On Metacritic, the film has a score of 64 out of 100, based on 27 critics, indicating "generally favorable reviews." Audiences polled by CinemaScore gave the film an average grade of "A" on an A+ to F scale.

Janet Maslin, reviewing for The New York Times, summarized the film as not a "great show of wit or tunefulness here, and the ingenious cross-generational touches are fairly rare. But there is a lively kiddie version of the Dickens tale, one that very young viewers ought to understand." The Chicago Sun-Times film critic Roger Ebert, who gave the film three stars out of four, praised the technical achievements, but felt it "could have done with a few more songs than it has, and the merrymaking at the end might have been carried on a little longer, just to offset the gloom of most of Scrooge's tour through his lifetime spent spreading misery." On the television program Siskel & Ebert, his partner Chicago Tribune film critic Gene Siskel gave the film a Thumbs Down although he was favorable towards Michael Caine's performance.

Also from The Chicago Tribune, Dave Kehr reviewed the film as "a talky, plodding film that seems likely to bore children and adults in equal measure." Nevertheless, Kehr praised Val Strazovec's production design and John Fenner's cinematography believing its "shadowy, naturalistic lighting creates a new look for a puppet film," but derided Paul Williams's songs as unmemorable. Likewise, Variety praised the production design and criticized Williams's songs, writing Muppets Christmas Carol is "not as enchanting or amusing as the previous entries in the Muppet series. But nothing can really diminish the late Jim Henson's irresistibly appealing characters.”

Giving the film three stars out of five, Almar Haflidason of the BBC wrote the film is "liberal but fun adaptation of a classic" that "turns out to be quite touching as Muppet movies go. Less pleasing are the forgettable songs that offer both clumsy word construction and dire music that eats away at the aesthetic quality of the movie. But you'll be too busy looking out for the assorted Muppets to care much." Anthony McGlynn of Screen Rant called The Muppet Christmas Carol "a work of genius on every level" and "the greatest Christmas movie ever made," praising the original songs that were written for the film and Michael Caine's performance as Scrooge.

Home media
This is the first Muppet film co-produced and released by Walt Disney Pictures—and the rights to the Muppets featured in the film would later be purchased by the studio's parent company. In addition to theatrical releases, the film has also been made available on home video formats. It was first released on VHS in the US on November 5, 1993, in the UK on November 15, 1993, and later on DVD in both countries. The first US DVD release on October 8, 2002, was in a full-screen-only format. Walt Disney Home Entertainment re-released the film in the US on DVD on November 29, 2005, in conjunction with Kermit the Frog's 50th anniversary celebration; this time the DVD contained both full-screen and widescreen presentations. The UK has also had similar DVD releases.

Walt Disney Studios Home Entertainment released a 20th anniversary collector's edition on Blu-ray, DVD, and digital copy on November 6, 2012. The release does not include the film's extended cut. However, the song "When Love Is Gone" and its accompanying scene can be viewed in its entirety on the full-screen version of the anniversary edition of The Muppet Christmas Carol, though it is cut in the widescreen format.

On December 9, 2022, Disney+ released a 30th anniversary edition via streaming media which includes the song "When Love Is Gone" as an option in its menu.

A story album of the movie was nominated for a Grammy Award for Best Spoken Word Album for Children in 1994.

Music
The film's original score was composed by Miles Goodman with songs written by Paul Williams. Williams previously worked with the Muppets on the soundtrack to The Muppet Movie (1979) in which he and Kenneth Ascher were nominated for an Academy Award for writing "Rainbow Connection." Goodman previously scored several films that were directed by Muppet performer Frank Oz.

Soundtrack

The Muppet Christmas Carol: Original Motion Picture Soundtrack contains all of the songs from the film, which were written by Paul Williams, as well several cues from the score by Miles Goodman. However, most of them are different arrangements than what appear in the film. The performances are by the Muppet characters as well as Caine, and the album also includes the songs "Room in Your Heart" and "Chairman of the Board" that were recorded but never filmed. As with all previous Muppet films, The Muppet Christmas Carol was shot as a musical. The soundtrack album peaked at number 189 on the Billboard 200 chart. The soundtrack was digitally re-released by Walt Disney Records on November 6, 2012.

Track listing

"When Love Is Gone"
"When Love Is Gone" is a song sung by the character Belle (portrayed by Meredith Braun) as she laments that Scrooge's love of money has replaced his love of her. The song itself was cut from the original 1992 American theatrical edition of the film by Jeffrey Katzenberg  the then-chairman of Walt Disney Studios, who believed that the song would not appeal to young viewers. Instead, the song was played during the film's end credits scene. Brian Henson objected to this decision as the concluding song, "The Love We Found," was a direct counterpoint to it.

Henson commented: "'When Love Is Gone' was not in the theatrical release, and is presently missing from some copies of the movie, which is a real shame." The song titled "When Love Is Gone" is only included on some home media releases of The Muppet Christmas Carol which are now out of print. It is included as a deleted scene in the "extras" section of the film on Disney+. The section also includes an option to view the entire film with the song restored to its original place.

The song is included on all of the 1993 VHS and LaserDisc releases of the film, as well as at least one UK VHS release. The LaserDisc version includes the only widescreen presentation of this song ever released.

The 2002 and 2005 DVD releases of the movie retain the song in the 90-minute full-screen version of the film, but not in the 86-minute widescreen version on the same disc. A 2012 standalone DVD release of the film uses the same disc from the 2005 release, so it also contains the song. However, a different DVD was used for the 2012 Blu-ray combo pack which does not contain the song. The digital download release of the film contains the entire "When Love Is Gone" as a bonus feature, in widescreen and in high definition.

In a 2018 interview with The Big Issue, Henson said he believed that the song was "unlikely" to appear in any further releases of the film, because Disney had reportedly lost the original video master and film negative. However, on December 9, 2020, Henson confirmed to BBC Radio 2 that the original film negative featuring the entire footage of the song had been found by Disney archivists and would be included in all future 4K releases. Due to time constraints, Disney+ was unable to include the new full version on its Christmas 2020 streaming release of the film. At the 2022 D23 Expo in September, Henson stated the full version of the film with the song left intact would be available on Disney+ on December 11 of that year. The full version of the film with the song included was made available on Disney+ in the film's "extras" section on December 9, 2022.

See also
 List of Christmas films
 List of ghost films
 Adaptations of A Christmas Carol

References

External links

 
 
 
 

1990s Christmas films
1990s musical comedy films
1992 films
1992 comedy films
1992 directorial debut films
1992 musical films
American children's fantasy films
American Christmas films
American ghost films
American musical comedy films
American musical fantasy films
Cultural depictions of Charles Dickens
Films based on A Christmas Carol
Films directed by Brian Henson
Films scored by Miles Goodman
Films set in England
Films set in London
Films set in the 1840s
Films set in the Victorian era
Films shot at Shepperton Studios
Films shot in England
Films shot in Vancouver
Films with screenplays by Jerry Juhl
Musicals based on A Christmas Carol
Musicals by Paul Williams (songwriter)
The Jim Henson Company films
The Muppets films
Self-reflexive films
Walt Disney Pictures films
1990s English-language films
1990s American films